Walhar is a village in Tehsil Sadiqabad of Rahim Yar Khan Punjab, Pakistan. It is18.7 km away from  Sadiqabad city. Majority of the population consists of Terhaily (ترہیلی) caste, who h used to be called as surname of "Rais" (رئیس).

People of the area are education- friendly and prefer to earn higher education. However, few of the villagers opt for the trade and business.

Village also has a Government Primary School for Girls. As the village is located adjacent to Walhar Railway Station. Therefore, people also works in Pakistan Railways on different jobs.

Major profession of the villagers is Agriculture. While, others also work in the Education and Health Department. Some of the people are also shopkeepers. 

Famous Personalities of the Village are Rais Afzal, Rais Ghulam Murtaza Advocate, Rais Mehwal, Rais Saleem Secretary.

People love to play cricket as their favourite sports. 

Villages in Punjab, Pakistan
Villages in Rahim Yar Khan District